was a Japanese musical group formed in 1999.

In 2004 they had big hits with "Sadness crossing" (哀愁交差点) and "The days which become far" (遙かなる日々).

Members
Kenjiro Kido (Vocals)
Hiroyuki Kashima (Bass)
Hiroki Nakata (Guitar)
Ryoichi (Drums)

Discography
満ちて来たる日々 (2003)
現実逃走記 (2004)
東京ウォール (2005)
回帰線 (2006)
夢色ロジック (2007)
天国ベスト～BEST FIRE OF HEAVEN～ (2007)

External links
 
Page on Toy's Factory website 

Japanese rock music groups
Toy's Factory artists
Musical groups established in 1999
Musical groups disestablished in 2007
Musical groups from Ehime Prefecture
1999 establishments in Japan